XHWA-FM is a radio station on 98.5 FM in Xalapa, Veracruz, Mexico. It is owned by Avanradio and currently operated by Grupo Radio Digital and carries its "Soy FM" pop format.

History
XHWA received its concession on April 14, 1987. It was originally owned by Gloria Alicia Iñiguez Torres but sold in the 1990s to Avanradio.

The One FM dance format this station had prior to 2019 was later exported to Veracruz on Avanradio's XHFM 94.9. It ended its run May 31, 2019, as GRD took over and flipped the station to Exa FM.

Most of GRD's stations dropped their MVS Radio franchised brands on May 1, 2021. Remaining a pop station, XHWA adopted the same "Soy FM" imaging as used by XHPR-FM in the city of Veracruz.

References

1987 establishments in Mexico
Contemporary hit radio stations in Mexico
Mexican radio stations with expired concessions
Radio stations established in 1987
Radio stations in Veracruz
Spanish-language radio stations